The Overbrook Foundation is a philanthropic organization, founded in 1949.  Since its creation, it has donated more than $188 million to education and progressive causes.

History

Frank and Helen Altschul created Overbrook to fund education causes including his alma mater, Yale University. Altschul was an early supporter of NPR.

After Altschul's death in 1981, the foundation hired professional management under the stewardship of family members.

Major grants and initiatives

The foundation provides grants averaging $40,000 to causes including human rights and environmental causes primarily in the western hemisphere.

The foundation supports, for example, In Our Backyard, a crowdfunder of New York City environmental projects.

Position on political contributions

In 2015, Overbrook joined with like-minded foundations including the Rockefeller Brothers Fund, the Ford Foundation, the  Carnegie Corporation of New York, and the Turner Foundation to decry corporate contributions to political causes in the wake of the Citizens United v. FEC case.

References 

Non-profit organizations based in New York City
Foundations based in the United States
Organizations established in 1949
1949 establishments in New York (state)